Dale Hyatt (December 10, 1925 – March 28, 2013) was an American salesman and marketing person who was a longtime associate of Leo Fender and George Fullerton.

Hyatt joined the Army Air Forces in 1944, and served as a tail gunner on a B-17 bomber.  He completed 25 missions, and was shot down once over occupied France, but was able to make his way back to Allied lines and successfully returned to his bomber group.

Hyatt began working for Leo Fender in January, 1946, upon returning from World War II. He left Fender Music when Leo Fender sold the business to CBS in 1965, and rejoined Fender and George Fullerton when the three founded G&L Musical Instruments. Hyatt was the father of and marketing strategist behind G&L's highly collectible Broadcaster model; during its only production period from May 1985 through May, 1986, 869 guitars were made. Hyatt retired from G&L on November 4, 1991, about eight months following the death of his close friend Leo Fender.

Hyatt resided in Hawkins, Texas, prior to his death and owned one of the few known guitars to be signed by Leo Fender.

References

Guitar makers
American luthiers
1925 births
2013 deaths
Fender people
20th-century American businesspeople
United States Army Air Forces personnel of World War II
United States Army Air Forces soldiers
Shot-down aviators